is a Japanese drama television series based on the manga of the same name written and illustrated by Afro. Produced by TV Tokyo, SDP, and Headquarters, the series is directed by Takashi Ninomiya, Mamoru Koshino, and Kyōhei Tamazawa from a script written by Ayako Kitagawa. It follows Rin Shima encountering Nadeshiko Kagamihara for the first time while camping at Lake Motosu.

The series stars Haruka Fukuhara, Yūno Ōhara, Momoko Tanabe, Yumena Yanai, Sara Shida, Yurina Yanagi, and Kaho Tsuchimura as Rin Shima, Nadeshiko Kagamihara, Chiaki Ōgaki, Aoi Inuyama, Ena Saitō, Sakura Kagamihara, and Minami Toba, respectively. A live-action adaptation of the manga series for television was announced in November 2019 and was given a second season renewal in November 2020.

The series premiered in Japan on TV Tokyo, TV Osaka, and TV Aichi on January 10, 2020, and concluded on June 18, 2021, with 24 episodes broadcast over two seasons. Ahead of the premiere of the second season is a special program for the series, which was aired on March 29, 2021.

Episodes

Season 1 (2020)

Laid-Back Camp Special (2021)

Season 2 (2021)

Cast and characters

Main
 Haruka Fukuhara as Rin Shima:A teenage girl who has a passion for camping after being inspired by her grandfather in middle school.
 Yūno Ōhara as Nadeshiko Kagamihara:A teenage girl who falls asleep after riding her bicycle to Mount Fuji. Nadeshiko encounters Rin by that time and is inspired by her to try camping. She later joins the Outdoor Activities Club.
 Momoko Tanabe as Chiaki Ōgaki:The president of the Outdoor Activities Club who is acquainted with Rin yet is wary of her.
 Yumena Yanai as Aoi Inuyama:A teenage girl who speaks with a Kansai dialect and is the founding member of the Outdoor Activities Club along with Chiaki.
 Sara Shida as Ena Saitō:A teenage girl who is friends with Rin and supports her solo camping by sending her private messages while at home.
 Yurina Yanagi as Sakura Kagamihara:The older sister of Nadeshiko who loves driving.
 Kaho Tsuchimura as Minami Toba:A teacher at Motosu High School and the advisor of the Outdoor Activities Club.

Recurring
 Ayumi Mikata as Saki Shima: Rin's mother.
 Yusuke Noguchi as Shūichirō Kagamihara: Nadeshiko's father.
 Eiko Yamamoto as Shizuka Kagamihara: Nadeshiko's mother.
 Yuki Tayama as Nadeshiko's supervisor at her part-time job in Yutakaya

Guest
 Honoka Kitahara as Ryōko Toba: Minami's younger sister.
 Yuka Kouri as Kikukawa Subaru: A mountain climber whom Rin encounters at Yashajin Pass and later at a tea shop where she works.
 Aina Nishizawa as Akari Inuyama: Aoi's younger sister.
 Anna Ishii as Ayano Toki:A childhood friend of Nadeshiko who rides a motorcycle. She meets Rin when the latter visits the house of Nadeshiko's grandmother.
 Jun Hashimoto as Jun Saitō: Ena's father.
 Miki Kanai as Mr. Iida's daughter who has a pet corgi
 Manabu Hosoi as Mr. Iida: A owner of wine shop at Izu who is camping with her daughter at Lake Yamanaka.
 Sento Takemori as Shinichi Ichinomiya: A father of two who is camping nearby at the same campsite as Nadeshiko during her first solo camping.
 Kokoro Hirasawa as Haruka Ichinomiya: Shinichi's daughter.
 Yuki Takasugi as Hiroto Ichinomiya: Shinichi's son.

Production

Development and casting
In November 2019, TV Tokyo announced that Takashi Ninomiya, Mamoru Koshino, and Kyōhei Tamazawa would be directing and Ayako Kitagawa would be writing the live-action drama television adaptation of Laid-Back Camp manga series by Afro. Shinya Fujino at TV Tokyo, Kiichi Kumagai at Headquarters, and Tatsuya Iwakura at SDP would be producing the series. That month, Haruka Fukuhara, Yūno Ōhara, Momoko Tanabe, Yumena Yanai, and Sara Shida were revealed to be starring as Rin Shima, Nadeshiko Kagamihara, Chiaki Ōgaki, Aoi Inuyama, and Ena Saitō, respectively. In December 2019, Yurina Yanagi and Kaho Tsuchimura were announced to be joining the cast as Sakura Kagamihara and Minami Toba, respectively, with the talent dog Yamaguchi Choco portraying the live-action version of Chikuwa. In February 2020, comedian Hiroshi was announced to be making an appearance as "Solo Camper Hiroshi" in the eight and eleventh episode following his voice-only role in the third episode as a radio personality.

In November 2020, the series was renewed for a second season, with Kitagawa returning to write the script and Ninomiya, Koshino, and Tamazawa returning to direct. Tomohiro Goda at TV Tokyo (replacing Fujino), Kumagai at Headquarters, and Iwakura at SDP would be producing the season, with Goda's colleague Noboru Morita serving as the chief producer. That month, Fukuhara, Ōhara, Tanabe, Yanai, Shida, Yanagi, and Tsuchimura were set to be reprising their roles from the first season. In February 2021, a special program for the series, was announced for a March 29 release before the second season premiere. In March 2021, a live-action adaptation of Room Camp was announced to be aired along with the season. That month, Anna Ishii and Jun Hashimoto were revealed to be joining the cast as Ayano Toki and Jun Saitō, Ena's father, respectively. In April 2021, Akio Otsuka, who voiced Rin's grandfather in the anime series of the same name, reprised his role in the second episode, and comedian Mizuki Nishimura was revealed to be making an appearance in the sixth episode as the campsite manager at Lake Yamanaka.

Filming

Filming began in seven campsites that were used as inspiration for the settings in the manga series after obtaining a permit from the Home of Mt. Fuji Yamanashi Film Commission. The former Shimobe Elementary and Middle School in Minobu, Yamanashi was used as the filming location for Motosu High School, the fictional school where the characters of the series attend.

Music
In December 2019, it was announced that the opening and ending theme music for the first season would be  by H△G and "Replay" by Longman, respectively. The ending theme music was released digitally by Sony Music Labels on January 24, 2020, and is included in the album Just a Boy by Longman, which was released in Japan on February 5. The opening theme music is included in the Blu-ray album of the same name, which was released in Japan by Feel Mee on March 25.

In February 2021, it was announced that the opening theme music for the series' special episode and second season would be "Hello Youth" by Longman. In March 2021, Sarasa Kadowaki was revealed to be performing the ending theme music . The opening theme music was released digitally by Sony Music Labels on March 31, 2021, and is included in the mini-album This Is Youth by Longman, which was released in Japan on May 19. The ending theme music was released digitally on April 7, 2021.

Release

Broadcast
The first season of Laid-Back Camp premiered in Japan on TV Tokyo, TV Osaka, and TV Aichi on January 10, 2020, and concluded on March 27, consisting of 12 episodes. The special program Laid-Back Camp Special aired on TV Tokyo on March 29, 2021. The second season premiered on TV Tokyo, TV Osaka, and TV Aichi on April 2, 2021, and concluded on June 18, consisting of 12 episodes.

Home media
Amazon Prime Video serves as the streaming service for Laid-Back Camp in Japan. The Blu-ray and DVD for the first season was released in Japan on October 9, 2020. The Blu-ray and DVD for the second season was released in Japan on October 6, 2021, which includes the special program and the script for Room Camp.

Reception
Laid-Back Camp was ranked sixth among the top ten dramas of 2020 by writer and drama critic Reiichi Narima.

References

External links
 Laid-Back Camp (season 1) at TV Tokyo 
 Laid-Back Camp (season 2) at TV Tokyo 
 

2020 Japanese television series debuts
2021 Japanese television series endings
Japanese high school television series
Japanese television dramas based on manga
Television shows set in Yamanashi Prefecture
TV Tokyo original programming